Husson University is a private university in Bangor, Maine. It offers undergraduate and graduate degrees and as of Fall 2020 had a total enrollment of 3,476 students, including 799 graduate students in master's and doctoral programs.

Husson University is one of three universities in the Bangor area (the University of Maine at Augusta and the University of Maine are the others) and the only private university in the region. Husson also offers a number of online programs. The university previously operated satellite campuses around the state. The last of these campuses, at Northern Maine Community College, was shuttered in 2021. Students were transitioned to Husson's online programs.

History
Founded in 1898, Husson was originally named Shaw School of Business and was located on the second floor of a building in downtown Bangor.  Enrollment was low until after World War II, when its reputation grew as a business school. In 1953 the Maine Legislature authorized the school, newly-renamed as Husson College, to grant Bachelor of Science degrees. It subsequently became Husson University in 2008.

Today the University has four colleges, and two schools: the College of Business, the College of Health and Education, the College of Science and Humanities, the School of Pharmacy, and the New England School of Communications. The New England School of Communications, known by its abbreviation NESCom, was an independent school acquired  by Husson in 1997, and was separately accredited and operated semi-autonomously with control over its own tuition, hiring, admissions, and graduation requirements until 2014.

Since 2000, undergraduate enrollment has increased five to ten percent  with each incoming class. In response, the University continues to add a significant number of new faculty to its ranks. Today, students graduate having trained both in the specialties of their chosen fields and in how those fields fit into a broader cultural context. Husson ranks 54th on U.S. News & World Reports ranking of top universities in the United States for social mobility.

Accreditation
Husson University is accredited by the New England Commission of Higher Education (NECHE). In addition, specific programs have their own professional accreditations or approvals:

 International Accreditation Council for Business Education (IACBE) for their business programs.
 Commission on Collegiate Nursing Education (CCNE) for their bachelor's and master's degree programs in nursing.
 Accreditation Council for Occupational Therapy Education (ACOTE) for their occupational therapy programs.
 Accreditation Council for Pharmacy Education (ACPE) for their Doctor of Pharmacy program.
 Council for Accreditation of Counseling & Related Educational Programs (CACREP) for their Clinical Mental Health Counseling and School Counseling graduate programs.
 Commission on Accreditation in Physical Therapy Education (CAPTE) for their School of Physical Therapy.
 American Board of Physical Therapy Education Residency (ABPTRFE). The School of Physical Therapy is a member of this organization.
 State of Maine Department of Education has approved the school counseling and teacher education programs in the School of Education.
 National Board for Certified Counselors has approved the master's degree programs in clinical mental health and school counseling to provide continuing professional education and development.

Campus
The Husson University Campus in Bangor, includes the Newman Gymnasium, the Winkin Sports Complex, Robert O'Donnell Commons (the College of Health and Education is located here), Peabody Hall (including the Sawyer Library, the College of Business, and the Ross Furman Student Center), the Dickerman Dining Center (renovated in 2012), the Dyke Center for Family Business, the Wildey Communications Center (named for NESCOM founder George Wildey), and the Beardsley Meeting House (named for former Husson President and current Commissioner of the Department of Conservation William Beardsley) which houses the 500-seat Gracie Theatre, and Living Learning Center which houses upperclassmen in suites and holds offices and classrooms on the ground floor. There are four residence halls: Hart Hall, Bell Hall, Carlisle Hall, and the Living & Learning Center, a LEED Silver targeted student residence and academic building which opened in the fall of 2012. Two walking trails circle the outer perimeter and offer scenic walks through the Maine forest.

Gracie Theatre
The Gracie Theatre, located in the Beardsley Meeting House, is a 500-seat multipurpose venue. Opera singer Richard Troxell, comedian Bob Marley, and the Bangor Symphony Orchestra have all performed in the Gracie. It also serves as a "learning platform" for the New England School of Communications, which has staged musicals (including West Side Story and The Who's Tommy) there and operates the theatre during other events.

Student life
There are dozens of student clubs and organizations, mostly professional, such as Public Relations Student Society of America (PRSSA), Student Government, The English Society, Accounting Society, Criminal Justice Club, OPTS (Organization of Physical Therapy Students), OOTS (Organization of Occupational Therapy Students), the Organization of Student Nurses, Outdoors Club, Student Newspaper, Husson University Theatre, GAMERS, Q&A, Technology Club, Student Veterans Association, Running Club, Ski & Snowboard Club, Pep Band, Audio Engineering Society, Cru, and Husson College Republicans. The University also owns WHSN 89.3 FM, an alternative rock station operated by the New England School of Communications.

Husson currently has two active sororities and one fraternity. Delta Sigma Delta and Kappa Delta Phi NAS, chapter Kappa Lambda and Kappa Delta Phi National fraternity, Lambda Chapter. Previously Husson University Greek Life included Mu Sigma Chi, Epsilon Tau Epsilon, and Tau Kappa Epsilon. Husson's founder member of Kappa Delta Phi fraternity, Chesley Husson, founded the organization Mu Sigma Chi which then founded Epsilon Tau Epsilon and Delta Sigma Delta. Each active organization provides service to the school, students and campus as well as the greater Bangor Maine area.  Husson Greek Life is organized by the Greek Governing Board. Greek life used to have a floor at the dorms assigned to their members, lounges, social events and more but during recent years these have not been allowed anymore. Members meet up on a reserved room for Greek Life or at off campus locations and hold community service and activities both on and off campus.

Athletics
Husson University teams are known as the Eagles. The university is a member of the NCAA Division III and fields twenty one varsity sports teams in the North Atlantic Conference (primary), Commonwealth Coast Football (football) and the Great Northeast Athletic Conference (swimming and diving). Sports offered include men's & women's soccer, men's & women's lacrosse, men's & women's cross country, men's & women's basketball, men's football, women's field hockey, men's and women's swimming & diving, men's and women's golf, women's outdoor track & field, women's indoor track & field, baseball, softball, and women's volleyball. Husson University also has three spirit teams including Cheer Team, Dance Team, and Pep Band.

Residence life 
Residents on campus live in one of five living options; Hart Hall, Bell Hall, Carlisle Hall, or the Edward O. and Mary Ellen Darling Living and Learning Center, and Husson Townhouses. Roughly 1,200 students live on campus during the academic year. Until Fall 2012, Husson University sublet apartments off-campus to students, however the construction of the new Darling Learning Center provides enough on-campus housing to end that practice. Freshmen and sophomore students attending full-time must live in a residence hall until they complete 54 credit hours, or meet other requirements in order to move off-campus. Husson is a wet campus.

Notable alumni 
 Tarren Bragdon, think tank founder and former Maine state legislator
 James R. Flynn, country music songwriter
 Phil Harriman, political commentator and former Maine state legislator
 George Hasay, former Pennsylvania state legislator
 Peter Lyford, Maine state legislator
 Terry Morrison, businessman and former Maine state legislator
 Paul LePage, 74th Governor of Maine
 Edward Youngblood, banker and former Maine state legislator

References

External links
 

 
1898 establishments in Maine
Educational institutions established in 1898
Private universities and colleges in Maine
Education in Bangor, Maine
Universities and colleges in Penobscot County, Maine